Ostrogozhsky District  is an administrative and municipal district (raion), one of the thirty-two in Voronezh Oblast, Russia. It is located in the west of the oblast. Its administrative center is the town of Ostrogozhsk. Population:  The population of Ostrogozhsk accounts for 58.3% of the district's total population.

People
 Ivan Kramskoi (1837-1887)

References

Notes

Sources

Districts of Voronezh Oblast